The Rogerson River is a river of the north Canterbury region of New Zealand's South Island. It flows generally east, reaching the Chatterton River at the town of Hanmer Springs.

See also
List of rivers of New Zealand

References

Rivers of Canterbury, New Zealand
Rivers of New Zealand